Shadow Secretary of State for Environment, Food and Rural Affairs is a position with the UK Opposition's Shadow Cabinet that deals with issues surrounding the environment and food and rural affairs; if the opposition party is elected to government, the designated person is a likely choice to become the new Secretary of State for Environment, Food and Rural Affairs.

The position existed as Shadow Secretary of State for the Environment until 1997, when it was renamed Environment, Transport and the Regions to match the Government's reorganisation. It changed to its current name in 2001 for the same reason. Under Michael Howard, the arrangement was slightly different. There was a Shadow Environment Secretary outside Shadow Cabinet and (together with the Shadow Transport Secretary) under the direction of the Shadow Secretary of State for Environment and Transport.

Shadow Secretaries of State

References

Official Opposition (United Kingdom)